The Japanese video game magazine Famitsu reviews video games by having four critics each assign the game a score from 0 to 10, with 10 being the highest score. The scores of are then added together for a maximum possible score of 40. , twenty-seven games have received perfect scores from Famitsu. The console with the highest number of perfect-scoring games is the PlayStation 3, with seven total. Four of the perfect-scoring games on PlayStation 3 were also released on the Xbox 360, which is tied with the Wii for the second-highest number of perfect scores at five total.

The first game to receive a perfect score was The Legend of Zelda: Ocarina of Time, released in 1998 by Nintendo for the Nintendo 64. Nintendo is the publisher with the highest number of perfect scoring games with nine total, followed by Square Enix with five, and both Konami and Sega with three. Nintendo is additionally the developer with the highest number of perfect scoring games with seven total, followed by Kojima Productions and Square Enix with four each. Video game franchises with multiple perfect scoring games include The Legend of Zelda with four, Metal Gear with three, and both Dragon Quest and Final Fantasy with two. Of the games to receive perfect scores, only three were either published and/or developed by a non-Japanese company – The Elder Scrolls V: Skyrim, Grand Theft Auto V, and Ghost of Tsushima.

Reviews

Perfect scores
, twenty-seven games have received perfect scores from Famitsu.

Near-perfect scores
, fifty-two games have received a near-perfect score of 39.

Awards & accolades

Famitsu Awards
Famitsu administers the Famitsu awards. Video games receive a number of different awards in categories like Innovation, Biggest Hit, Rookie Award, Highest Quality, etc. One or two "Game of the Year" awards are granted as the top prize. Top prize winners are determined by a combination of critical and fan review scores as well as sales figures. They also give an "Excellence Prize" to other games that don't receive the top prize.

Prior to the formal establishment of the Famitsu Awards ceremony, Famitsu had been publishing annual lists of "Best Hit Game Awards" since early 1987 (for games released in 1986). The following titles were "Game of the Year" winners in the "Best Hit Game Awards" (between 1986 and 2004) and the Famitsu Awards (from 2005 onwards).

2006 readers' poll
In March 2006, Famitsu readers voted for their 100 all-time favorite games.

 Super Mario Bros. (1985, FC)
 Spartan X (1985, FC)
 Gradius (1986, FC)
 The Legend of Zelda (1986, FCD)
 Dragon Quest (1986, FC)
 Pro Yakyū Family Stadium (1986, FC)
 Final Fantasy (1987, FC)
 Dragon Quest II (1987, FC)
 Wizardry (1987, FC)
 Hokkaidō Rensa Satsujin: Okhotsk ni Kiyu (1987, FC)
 Pro Baseball Family Stadium '87 (1987, FC)
 Super Mario Bros. 3 (1988, FC)
 Final Fantasy II (1988, FC)
 Dragon Quest III (1988, FC)
 Best Play Pro Yakyū (1988, FC)
 Tetris (1989, GB)
 Mother (1989, FC)
 Ys I & II (1989, PCE)
 Super Mario World (1990, SFC)
 F-Zero (1990, SFC)
 Final Fantasy Legend II (1990, GB)
 Final Fantasy III (1990, FC)
 Final Fight (1990, SFC)
 Super Monaco GP (1990, MD)
 Digital Devil Story: Megami Tensei II (1990, FC)
 Dragon Quest IV: Chapters of the Chosen (1990, FC)
 The Legend of Zelda: A Link to the Past (1991, SFC)
 Sonic the Hedgehog (1991, MD)
 SimCity (1991, SFC)
 Final Fantasy IV (1991, SFC)
 Tengai Makyō II: Manjimaru (1992, PCE)
 Romancing SaGa (1992, SFC)
 Shin Megami Tensei (1992, SFC)
  Puyo Puyo (1992, MD)
 Super Mario Kart (1992, SFC)
 Dragon Quest V: Hand of the Heavenly Bride (1992, SFC)
 Final Fantasy V (1992, SFC)
 Street Fighter II (1992, SFC)
 Ogre Battle (1993, SFC)
 Torneko's Great Adventure: Mystery Dungeon (1993, SFC)
 Street Fighter II Turbo (1993, SFC)
 Seiken Densetsu II (1993, SFC)
 Final Fantasy VI (1994, SFC)
 Virtua Fighter (1994, SAT)
 Mother 2 (1994, SFC)
  Tokimeki Memorial (1994, PCE)
  Fire Emblem: Monshō no Nazo (1994, SFC)
  Kamaitachi no Yoru (1994, SFC)
 Virtua Fighter 2 (1995, SAT) 
 Chrono Trigger (1995, SFC)
 Dragon Quest VI: Realms of Revelation (1995, SFC)
 Tactics Ogre (1995, SFC)
 Tokimeki Memorial: Forever With You (1995, PS)
 Mystery Dungeon 2 (1995, SFC)
 Tokimeki Memorial: Forever With You (1996, SAT)
 Sakura Taisen (1996, SAT)
  Resident Evil (1996, PS)
 Pokémon Red and Green (1996, GB)
  Final Fantasy Tactics (1997, PS)
  Tales of Destiny (1997, PS)
 Grandia (1997, SAT)
 Final Fantasy VII (1997, PS)
  Metal Gear Solid (1998, PS)
 Machi (1998, SAT)
 The Legend of Zelda: Ocarina of Time (1998, N64)
 Sakura Taisen II (1998, SAT)
  Resident Evil 2 (1998, PS)
 Xenogears (1998, PS)
 Final Fantasy VIII (1999, PS)
 Valkyrie Profile (1999, PS)
 Fushigi no Dungeon: Fūrai no Shiren 2: Oni Shūrai! Shiren-jō! (2000, N64)
 Tales of Eternia (2000, PS)
 Dragon Quest VII (2000, PS)
 Super Robot Wars Alpha (2000, PS)
 Final Fantasy IX (2000, PS)
 Sakura Taisen III (2001, DC)
 Metal Gear Solid 2: Sons of Liberty (2001, PS2)
 Dynasty Warriors 3 (2001, PS2)
  Final Fantasy X (2001, PS2)
 Kingdom Hearts (2002, PS2)
 Tales of Destiny 2 (2002, PS2)
 Sakura Taisen IV (2002, DC)
 The Legend of Zelda: The Wind Waker (2002, GCN)
 Final Fantasy X-2 (2003, PS2)
 Dynasty Warriors 4 (2003, PS2)
 Grand Theft Auto: Vice City (2004, PS2)
 Gran Turismo 4 (2004, PS2)
 To Heart 2 (2004, PS2)
 Dragon Quest V (2004, PS2)
 Metal Gear Solid 3: Snake Eater (2004, PS2)
 Dragon Quest VIII: Journey of the Cursed King (2004, PS2)
 Tales of Rebirth (2004, PS2)
 Monster Hunter (2004, PS2)
 Resident Evil 4 (2005, GCN)
 Kingdom Hearts II (2005, PS2)
 Resident Evil 4 (2005, PS2)
 Animal Crossing: Wild World (2005, NDS)
 Tales of the Abyss (2005, PS2)
 Monster Hunter Portable (2005, PSP)
 Monster Hunter G (2005, PS2)

Notes

References

Video game lists by reception or rating